Ward Hunt (1810–1886) is a U.S. politician and jurist.

Ward Hunt may also refer to:

People
 George Ward Hunt (1825–1877), UK politician, First Lord of the Admiralty
 Ward Hunt Goodenough (1919–2013), U.S. anthropologist

Places
 Ward Hunt Island, Canadian Arctic Archipelago, Nunavut, Canada
 Ward Hunt Ice Shelf, Ellesmere Island, Canadian Arctic Archipelago, Nunavut, Canada
 Ward Hunt Strait, Papua New Guinea
 Cape Ward Hunt, Oro Province, Papua New Guinea

See also

 Ward (disambiguation)
 Hunt (disambiguation)